The 2011 Navy Midshipmen football team represented the United States Naval Academy as an independent in the 2011 NCAA Division I FBS football season. The Midshipmen were led by fourth-year head coach Ken Niumatalolo and played their home games at Navy–Marine Corps Memorial Stadium. They finished the season 5–7.

Schedule

Roster
 Kriss Proctor
 PK Jon Teague

Game summaries

Delaware

Western Kentucky

South Carolina

Air Force

Southern Miss

Rutgers

East Carolina

Notre Dame

Troy

SMU

San Jose State

Army

References

Navy
Navy Midshipmen football seasons
Navy Midshipmen football